In Greek mythology, Copreus (Ancient Greek: Κοπρεύς, Kopreús meaning "dung man") may refer to the following individuals:

 Copreus, king of Haliartus and grandson of Orchomenus. He married Pisidice, daughter of Leucon and by her, became the father of Hippoclus and Argynnus. Copreus presented the immortal horse Arion to Heracles. The hero rode the steed in his contest with Cycnus, son of Ares.
 Copreus, herald of King Eurystheus of Mycenae.

Notes

References 

 Apollodorus, The Library with an English Translation by Sir James George Frazer, F.B.A., F.R.S. in 2 Volumes, Cambridge, MA, Harvard University Press; London, William Heinemann Ltd. 1921. ISBN 0-674-99135-4. Online version at the Perseus Digital Library. Greek text available from the same website.
Gantz, Timothy, Early Greek Myth: A Guide to Literary and Artistic Sources, Johns Hopkins University Press, 1996, Two volumes:  (Vol. 1),  (Vol. 2).

Kings in Greek mythology
Minyan characters in Greek mythology